The following outline is provided as an overview of and topical guide to association football:

Association football – sport played between two teams of eleven players with a spherical ball. At the turn of the 21st century, the game was played by over 250 million players in over 200 countries, making it the world's most popular sport. More commonly known as football or soccer.

What type of thing is association football? 
Association football can be described as all of the following:

 Exercise – bodily activity that enhances or maintains physical fitness and overall health or wellness.
 Aerobic exercise – physical exercise that intends to improve the oxygen system. Aerobic means "with oxygen", and refers to the use of oxygen in the body's energy-generating process (the citric acid cycle).
 Game – structured activity, usually undertaken for enjoyment and sometimes used as an educational tool. Games are distinct from work, which is usually carried out for remuneration, and from art, which is more concerned with the expression of ideas. However, the distinction is not clear-cut, and many games are also considered to be work (such as professional sports).
 Ball game – game played with a ball.
 A type of football – sport that involves kicking a ball with the foot to score a goal.
 Sport – form of physical activity which, through casual or organised participation, aim to use, maintain or improve physical fitness and provide entertainment to participants.
 Competitive sport – sport in which one or more participants or teams compete against one another. The one that is the most successful in achieving the objective of the game or sport event is the winner.
 A type of football – sport that involves kicking a ball with the foot to score a goal.
 Goal sport – sport in which an attacking team must send a ball or puck into a physical structure or area called a "goal" in order to score points.
 Team sport – sport that involves players working together towards a shared objective.
 Recreational sport – sport engaged in as a leisure time activity.
 Spectator sport – sport that is characterized by the presence of spectators, or watchers, at its matches. Spectator sports are a form of entertainment.
 Professional sport – sport in which the athletes receive payment for their performance.

Names for association football 

Names for association football
 football
 futbol
 futboll
 fotbal

 soccer

Equipment of the game 

 Association football pitch (playing field) –
 Football – ball used in the sport of association football. The ball's spherical shape, as well as its size, weight, and material composition, are specified by Law 2 of the Laws of the Game maintained by the International Football Association Board.
 Kit – standard equipment and attire worn by players.
 Basic
 jersey
 shorts
 socks
 footwear
 shin pads

Rules of the game 

Laws of the game – the rules.
 Law 1: The Field of Play
 Law 2: The Ball
 Law 3: The Number of Players
 Law 4: The Players' Equipment
 Law 5: The Referee
 Law 6: The Assistant Referees
 Law 7: The Duration of the Match
 Law 8: The Start and Restart of Play
 Law 9: The Ball in and Out of Play
 Law 10: The Method of Scoring
 Law 11: Offside
 Law 12: Fouls and Misconduct
 Law 13: Free kicks (direct and indirect)
 Law 14: The Penalty Kick
 Law 15: The Throw-In
 Law 16: The Goal Kick
 Law 17: Corner kick

Variants of association football 

 Crab football
 Jorkyball
 Powerchair football
 Swamp football
 Three-sided football
 Walking football

 Beach soccer – football played on sand, also known as sand soccer
 Freestyle Football – modern take on Keepie uppie where freestylers are graded for their entertainment value and expression of skill.
 Indoor varieties of Association football:
 Five-a-side football – played throughout the world under various rules including:
 Futsal ('futebol de salão') – the FIFA-approved Five-a-side indoor game
 Indoor soccer – the six-a-side indoor game as played in North America
 Keepie uppie – art of juggling with a football using feet, knees, chest, shoulders, and head.
 Footbag  – small bean bag or sand bag used as a ball in a number of keepie uppie variations such as hacky sack.
 Paralympic Football – modified association football for disabled competitors.
 Rush goalie – variation of football in which the role of the goalkeeper is more flexible than normal.
 Street football – encompasses a number of informal varieties of football.
 Women's association football

Game play

Strategy 

 Training ground (association football)
 Formation (association football)
 Association football positions

Tactics and techniques 

Association football tactics and skills
 Anti-football
 Behind The Leg Flip Flap
 Bicycle kick
 Catenaccio
 Combination Game
 Corner kick
 Cruijff Turn
 Curl
 Direct free kick
 Diving
 Flip flap
 Flo Pass
 Formation
 Last man
 Long ball
 Marseille turn
 Nutmeg
 One touch
 Passing
 Pelé runaround move
 Push and run
 Rabona
 Rainbow kick
 Revie Plan
 Seal dribble
 Shooting
 Sliding tackle
 Step over
 Tiki-taka
 Total Football
 Volley
 Work rate

Association football teams 

 Football club (association football)
 List of association football clubs
 List of men's national association football teams
 List of women's national association football teams
 List of women's association football clubs

History of association football 

History of association football

History of association football, by period 

 Timeline of association football
 Timeline of English football
 Timeline of Scottish football
 Prehistory of association football
 Association football during World War I
 Association football during World War II
 List of footballers killed during World War II

By year 

1840s ·
1850s ·
1860s
1870 ·
1871 ·
1872 ·
1873 ·
1874 ·
1875 ·
1876 ·
1877 ·
1878 ·
1879
1880 ·
1881 ·
1882 ·
1883 ·
1884 ·
1885 ·
1886 ·
1887 ·
1888 ·
1889
1890 ·
1891 ·
1892 ·
1893 ·
1894 ·
1895 ·
1896 ·
1897 ·
1898 ·
1899
1900 ·
1901 ·
1902 ·
1903 ·
1904 ·
1905 ·
1906 ·
1907 ·
1908 ·
1909
1910 ·
1911 ·
1912 ·
1913 ·
1914 ·
1915 ·
1916 ·
1917 ·
1918 ·
1919
1920 ·
1921 ·
1922 ·
1923 ·
1924 ·
1925 ·
1926 ·
1927 ·
1928 ·
1929
1930 ·
1931 ·
1932 ·
1933 ·
1934 ·
1935 ·
1936 ·
1937 ·
1938 ·
1939
1940 ·
1941 ·
1942 ·
1943 ·
1944 ·
1945 ·
1946 ·
1947 ·
1948 ·
1949
1950 ·
1951 ·
1952 ·
1953 ·
1954 ·
1955 ·
1956 ·
1957 ·
1958 ·
1959
1960 ·
1961 ·
1962 ·
1963 ·
1964 ·
1965 ·
1966 ·
1967 ·
1968 ·
1969
1970 ·
1971 ·
1972 ·
1973 ·
1974 ·
1975 ·
1976 ·
1977 ·
1978 ·
1979
1980 ·
1981 ·
1982 ·
1983 ·
1984 ·
1985 ·
1986 ·
1987 ·
1988 ·
1989
1990 ·
1991 ·
1992 ·
1993 ·
1994 ·
1995 ·
1996 ·
1997 ·
1998 ·
1999
2000 ·
2001 ·
2002 ·
2003 ·
2004 ·
2005 ·
2006 ·
2007 ·
2008 ·
2009
2010 ·
2011 ·
2012 ·
2013 ·
2014 ·
2015 ·
2016 ·
2017 ·
2018 ·
2019
2020

History of association football, by region 
 History of football in Tibet and the diaspora
 History of soccer in the United States
 History of professional soccer in Seattle

History of association football, by subject 

 History of CAF
 Christianity and association football
 History of the Copa Libertadores
 History of FIFA
 History of the FIFA World Cup
 Homosexuality in association football
 Mental health in association football
 Football club mergers
 Oldest football clubs
 Oldest football competitions
 Professionalism in association football
 Racism in association football
 Unrelegated association football clubs

Association football culture 

Association football culture
 Professionalism in association football

Association football around the world 

Association football around the world
 Names for association football (what it is called, where)
 List of association football stadiums by country

Association football organizations

Association football competitions

International competitions 
 List of association football competitions

Domestic competitions 
 Geography of association football
 Geography of women's association football

Governing bodies 
 FIFA
 Asian Football Confederation
 CONCACAF
 Confederation of African Football
 CONMEBOL
 Oceania Football Confederation
 UEFA
 International Football Association Board

Association football publications 

 Kicker
 Match
 FourFourTwo
 France Football
 Kick Off
 Offside
 Onze Mondial
 Shekicks
 Shoot
 World Soccer

Persons influential in association football

Contributors

Players 

 List of top association football goal scorers
 Lists of association football players

Coaches

See also 

 Glossary of association football terms
 Outline of sports
 Domestic association football season
 List of national football teams
 List of association football clubs
 List of association football competitions
 List of sports attendance figures – Attendances of many domestic and international competitions, compared with those of other sports around the world

References

External links 

 Federation Internationale de Football Association (FIFA)
 The Current Laws of the Game (LOTG)
 The Rec.Sport.Soccer Statistics Foundation (RSSSF)
 FIFA: Women's Football
 Women's Football History
 Women's Soccer United: Home of Worldwide Women's Football

Football, association
Football, association